The Sphingidae are a family of moths (Lepidoptera) called sphinx moths, also colloquially known as hawk moths, with many of their caterpillars known as “hornworms”; it includes about 1,450 species. It is best represented in the tropics, but species are found in every region. They are moderate to large in size and are distinguished among moths for their agile and sustained flying ability, similar enough to that of hummingbirds as to be reliably mistaken for them. Their narrow wings and streamlined abdomens are adaptations for rapid flight. The family was named by French zoologist Pierre André Latreille in 1802.

Some hawk moths, such as the hummingbird hawk-moth or the white-lined sphinx, hover in midair while they feed on nectar from flowers, so are sometimes mistaken for hummingbirds. This hovering capability is only known to have evolved four times in nectar feeders: in hummingbirds, certain bats, hoverflies, and these sphingids (an example of convergent evolution). Sphingids have been much studied for their flying ability, especially their ability to move rapidly from side to side while hovering, called "swing-hovering" or "side-slipping". This is thought to have evolved to deal with ambush predators that lie in wait in flowers.

Description

Antennae are generally not very feathery, even in males. They lack tympanal organs, but members of the group Choerocampini have hearing organs on their heads. They have a frenulum and retinaculum to join hindwings and forewings.  The thorax, abdomen, and wings are densely covered in scales. Some sphingids have a rudimentary proboscis, but most have a very long one, which is used to feed on nectar from flowers. Most are crepuscular or nocturnal, but some species fly during the day. Both males and females are relatively long-lived (10 to 30 days). Prior to flight, most species shiver their flight muscles to warm them up, and, during flight, body temperatures may surpass .

In some species, differences in form between the sexes is quite marked. For example, in the African species Agrius convolvuli (the convolvulus or morning glory hawk moth), the antennae are thicker and wing markings more mottled in the male than in the female. Only males have both an undivided frenular hook and a retinaculum. Also, all male hawkmoths have a partial comb of hairs along with their antennae. Females call males to them with pheromones. The male may douse the female with a pheromone before mating.

Behavior
Some species fly only for short periods either around dusk or dawn, while other species only appear later in the evening and others around midnight, but such species may occasionally be seen feeding on flowers during the day. A few common species in Africa, such as the Oriental bee hawk (Cephonodes hylas virescens), Macroglossum hirundo, and Macroglossum trochilus, are diurnal.

A number of species are known to be migratory, all in the Sphingini and Macroglossinae, and specially in the genera Agrius, Cephonodes, Macroglossum, Hippotion and Theretra.

Flight
In studies with Manduca sexta, moths have dynamic flight sensory abilities due to their antennae. The antennae are vibrated in a plane so that when the body of the moth rotates during controlled aerial maneuvers, the antennae are subject to the inertial Coriolis forces that are linearly proportional to the angular velocity of the body. The Coriolis forces cause deflections of the antennae, which are detected by the Johnston's organ at the base of each antenna, with strong frequency responses at the beat frequency of the antennae (around 25 Hz) and at twice the beat frequency. The relative magnitude of the two frequency responses enables the moth to distinguish rotation around the different principal axes, allowing for rapid course control during aerial maneuvers.

Life cycle
Most species are multivoltine, capable of producing several generations a year if weather conditions permit.  Females lay translucent, greenish, flattened, smooth eggs, usually singly on the host plants. Egg development time varies highly, from three to 21 days.

Sphingid caterpillars are medium to large in size, with stout bodies. They have five pairs of prolegs. Usually, their bodies lack any hairs or tubercules, but most species have a "horn" at the posterior end, which may be reduced to a button, or absent, in the final instar. Many are cryptic greens and browns, and have countershading patterns to conceal them. Others are more conspicuously colored, typically with white spots on a black or yellow background along the length of the body. A pattern of diagonal slashes along the side is a common feature. When resting, the larva usually holds its legs off the surface and tucks its head underneath (praying position), which, resembling the Great Sphinx of Giza, gives rise to the name "sphinx moth". Some tropical larvae are thought to mimic snakes. Larvae are quick to regurgitate their sticky, often toxic, foregut contents on attackers such as ants and parasitoids. Development rate depends on temperature, and to speed development, some northern and high-altitude species sunbathe. Larvae burrow into the soil to pupate, where they remain for two to three weeks before they emerge as adults.

In some Sphingidae, the pupa has a free proboscis, rather than being fused to the pupal case as is most common in the macrolepidoptera. They have a cremaster at the tip of the abdomen. Usually, they pupate off the host plant, in an underground chamber, among rocks, or in a loose cocoon. In most species, the pupa is the overwintering stage.

Food plants

Larvae

Sphingid larvae tend to be specific feeders, rather than generalists. Compared to similarly sized saturniids, sphingids eat soft young leaves of host plants with small toxic molecules, and chew and mash the food into very small bits. Some species can tolerate quite high concentrations of specific toxins. Tobacco hornworms (Manduca sexta) detoxify and rapidly excrete nicotine, as do several other related sphinx moths in the subfamilies Sphinginae and Macroglossinae, but members of the Smerinthinae that were tested are susceptible. The species that are able to tolerate the toxin do not sequester it in their tissues; 98% was excreted. However, other species, such as Hyles euphorbiae and Daphnis nerii, do sequester toxins from their hosts, but do not pass them on to the adult stage.

Adults

Most adults feed on nectar, although a few tropical species feed on eye secretions, and the death's-head hawkmoths steal honey from bees. Night-flying sphingids tend to prefer pale flowers with long corolla tubes and a sweet odor, a pollination syndrome known as "sphingophily". Some species are quite general in visitations, while others are very specific, with the plant only being successfully pollinated by a particular species of moth. Orchids frequently have such specific relations with hawk moths and very long corolla tubes. The comet orchid (Angraecum sesquipedale), a rare Malagasy flower with its nectar stored at the bottom of a  tube, was described in 1822 by Louis-Marie Aubert du Petit-Thouars, and later, Charles Darwin famously predicted there must be some specialized moth to feed from it:

Alfred Russel Wallace published a sort of "wanted poster" (properly, a drawing in a book) of what this lepidopteran might look like, and, concurring with his colleague, added:

The predicted sphingid was discovered 21 years later and described as a subspecies of the one African species studied by Wallace: Xanthopan morganii praedicta, for which, the subspecific name praedicta ("the predicted one") was given. The Madagascan individuals had a pink, rather than white, breast and abdomen and a black apical line on the forewing, broader than in mainland specimens. Molecular clock models using either rate- or fossil-based calibrations imply that the Madagascan subspecies X. morgani praedicta and the African subspecies morgani diverged 7.4 ± 2.8 Mya (million years ago), which overlaps the divergence of A. sesquipedale from its sister, A. sororium, namely 7.5 ± 5.2 Mya. Since both these orchids have extremely long spurs, longspurs likely existed before that and were exploited by long-tongued moths similar to Xanthopan morganii praedicta. The long geological separation of subspecies morgani and praedicta matches their morphological differences in the color of the breast and abdomen.

Relationships and species

The Sphingidae is sometimes assigned its own exclusive superfamily, Sphingoidea, but is alternatively included with the more encompassing Bombycoidea. Following Hodges (1971) two subfamilies are accepted, namely the Sphinginae and Macroglossinae. Around 1,450 species of hawk moths are classified into around 200 genera. Some of the best-known hawk moth species are:
 Privet hawk moth (Sphinx ligustri)
 White-lined Sphinx (Hyles lineata)
 Death's-head hawk moth (Acherontia atropos)
 Lime hawk moth (Mimas tiliae)
 Poplar hawk moth (Laothoe populi)
 Convolvulus hawk moth (Agrius convolvuli)
 Catalpa sphinx (Ceratomia catalpae)
 Hummingbird hawk-moth (Macroglossum stellatarum)
 Elephant hawk moth (Deilephila elpenor)
 Vine hawk moth (Hippotion celerio)
 Spurge hawk moth (Hyles euphorbiae)
 Oleander hawk moth (Daphnis nerii)
 Pandora sphinx moth (Eumorpha pandorus)
 Tomato worm (Manduca quinquemaculata)
 Tobacco hornworm (Manduca sexta)

See also
 Sphingidae species list

References

External links
 
 
 Sphingidae. Insecta.pro
 Images of Sphingidae of Costa Rica
 Images of Sphingidae species in New Zealand 
 List of Sphingidae Types from Museum Witt München
 Images from Flickr

 
Moth families
Taxa named by Pierre André Latreille